Charles Gautier (25 January 1945 – 11 June 2014) was a French politician who was a member of the Senate of France, representing the Loire-Atlantique department.  He was a member of the Socialist Party; a former mayor of Saint-Herblain, he died of colon cancer at his home in the town.

References

External links
Page on the Senate website

1945 births
2014 deaths
Socialist Party (France) politicians
French Senators of the Fifth Republic
Deaths from colorectal cancer
Mayors of places in Pays de la Loire
Deaths from cancer in France
Senators of Loire-Atlantique